A Personnel Certification Body is an organization that awards credentials to individuals meeting specific competence requirements relating to a profession, an occupation, a job or a portion of a job. A personnel certification body develops criteria against which an individual needs to demonstrate competencies and ensures that these criteria are held by applicants before certifying them. 

Most personnel certification bodies offer professional certification if an individual meets requirements such as a minimum number of years of related working experience, minimum education level and having passed a certification exam or equivalent.

Many personnel certification bodies are accredited by accrediting bodies to the ISO/IEC 17024 standard, which was designed to harmonize the personnel certification process worldwide. Most are not. Accreditation means having gone through a validation process or assessment from a national accreditation body such as the American National Standards Institute ANSI,  German Accreditation Body DAkkS, International Accreditation Service IAS, United Kingdom Accreditation Service UKAS (UK)), or the National Accreditation Board for Certification Bodies NABCB (India).

Many accredited personnel certifications bodies are members of the International Personnel Certification Association.

Notable personnel certification bodies 

 German Association for Quality
 International Register of Certificated Auditors
 Training Qualifications Certification Board 
 Institute of Certified Tax Accountants of Zimbabwe | ICTAZ

References 

 
Standards organizations